Christian Octavio Martinoli Curi (born 15 October 1975) is an Argentine-born Mexican sports journalist and sports commentator who currently works for Azteca Deportes. His father is from Argentina and his mother from Mexico. He is also of Italian descent.

He is recognized for expressing his opinion about players when he commentates games in dramatic and exciting ways. It can be from the Mexican First Division, the UEFA Champions League, and the Mexico national team.

In most cases, he works with former professional footballers Luis García, Jorge Campos and Zague. He also participates, along with Luis García, in the Pro Evolution Soccer video game franchise.

Martinoli is considered to be on a par with narrators such as: Manolo Lama, Mariano Closs, Luis Omar Tapia and Fernando Palomo.

References 

Mexican television presenters
Mexican journalists
Male journalists
Argentine emigrants to Mexico
People from Mar del Plata
1975 births
Living people